Thomas Dibley (1829 - 31 May 1912) was a member of the Queensland Legislative Assembly.

Biography
Dibley was born at Mudgee, New South Wales, the son of the Ebenezer Dibley and his wife  Mary (née Monckton). He was an apprentice in a Sydney tobacco factory and in 1865 moved to Queensland and leased J.M. Thompson's Cothill Estate in Ipswich. He then became a butcher and timber-getter in Noosa and the Wide-Bay regions and he then moved to Brisbane in 1893 where he worked as a butcher at Woolloongabba.

On 30 September 1867 Dibley married Matilda Marie Gates (died 1913) at Ipswich and together had four sons and four daughters. He died in May 1912 and was buried in the Balmoral Cemetery.

Public life
Dibley was an alderman on the South Brisbane Municipal Council before winning  the seat of Woolloongabba for Labour at the 1896 Queensland colonial election. He held the seat until 1907, when Dibley, by then a member of the Kidstonites, lost his seat to the Opposition Party's George Blocksidge.

References

Members of the Queensland Legislative Assembly
1829 births
1912 deaths
Burials in Balmoral Cemetery, Brisbane
Australian Labor Party members of the Parliament of Queensland